Synclera nigropenultimalis is a moth species in the family Crambidae. It was described by Jagbir Singh Kirti in 1993. It is found in Arunachal Pradesh, India.

References

Moths described in 1993
Spilomelinae
Moths of Asia